Kurt Creek is a stream in the U.S. state of Wisconsin. It is a tributary to the East Fork Black River. The headwaters of the creek is used for cranberry bogs.

Kurt Creek most likely was named after a settler named Kurt or Kert.

References

Rivers of Wood County, Wisconsin
Rivers of Wisconsin